{{DISPLAYTITLE:C23H28N2O4}}
The molecular formula C23H28N2O4 may refer to:

 Pacrinolol, a beta adrenergic receptor antagonist
 Pleiocarpine, an anticholinergic alkaloid

Molecular formulas